This is a list of seasons played by Norwich City F.C. in English and European football, from 1902 (the year of the club's foundation) to the most recent completed season.

The club has won the Football League Cup twice, the second flight three times, the third flight twice and has a highest ever league finish of third in the Premier League. This list details the club's achievements in all major competitions, and the top scorers for each season.

Professional era

Key

Pld = Matches played
W = Matches won
D = Matches drawn
L = Matches lost
GF = Goals for
GA = Goals against
Pts = Points
Pos = Final position

N&SL = Norfolk & Suffolk League
SL = Southern League
Div 1 = Football League First Division
Div 2 = Football League Second Division
Div 3(S) = Football League Third Division South
Prem = Premier League
Chmp = Championship
L1 = League One
n/a = Not applicable

QR1 = Qualifying round 1
QR2 = Qualifying round 2
QR3 = Qualifying round 3
QR4 = Qualifying round 4
R1 = Round 1
R2 = Round 2
R3 = Round 3
R4 = Round 4
R5 = Round 5
QF = Quarter-finals 
SF = Semi-finals

References

 

Seasons
 
Norwich City F.C.